The Oak Hill Cemetery Chapel, also known as the Renwick Chapel or James Renwick Chapel, is a historic building in the Georgetown neighborhood of Washington, D.C., United States.  Designed by James Renwick, Jr. in 1850, Oak Hill Cemetery Chapel is the architect's only known example of Gothic Revival church architecture in Washington, D.C.  It is located on the highest ridge in Oak Hill Cemetery, near the intersection of 29th and R Streets NW.  The chapel is one of two structures in Oak Hill Cemetery listed on the National Register of Historic Places, the other being the Van Ness Mausoleum.  The chapel, mausoleum, and cemetery are contributing properties to the Georgetown Historic District, a National Historic Landmark.

History 
On June 7, 1848, businessman and philanthropist William Wilson Corcoran (1798–1888) purchased Parrott's Woods, a  forest overlooking Rock Creek Park, from Lewis Washington, great-grandnephew of President George Washington.  Corcoran organized a company to establish a cemetery, and on March 3, 1849, the Oak Hill Cemetery Company was chartered by an Act of Congress.

Architect James Renwick, Jr. (1818–1895) was chosen to design a small chapel for the new cemetery.  Renwick, whose best known works include Grace Church, St. Patrick's Cathedral and the Corcoran Gallery of Art (currently the Renwick Gallery), began designing the chapel soon after he had finished the plans for the Smithsonian Institution Building.  The cost of constructing Oak Hill Cemetery Chapel was $9,400, which was paid by Corcoran.

On March 16, 1972, the National Park Service added Oak Hill Cemetery Chapel to the National Register of Historic Places.

Architecture 
Oak Hill Cemetery Chapel is considered an excellent example of Gothic Revival architecture, and often called a "miniature Gothic gem". It features a steeply designed pitched roof, buttresses, and stained glass lancet windows accented with tracery.

The building materials consist of Potomac gneiss, sandstone, and wood.  A cornerstone, inscribed with the date "1850", is located in a buttress on the chapel's northwest corner.  The chapel is accessible by a large, painted door on the west side.  The door is protected by a padlocked, wrought iron gate; the padlock bears the inscription: "Presented/Oak Hill Cemetery Co./By/James L. Norris/March 19, 1895."  A rose window with wooden mullions is located above the door.

Influence 
The design of Grace Episcopal Church, a Gothic Revival church built in 1867, is very similar to that of the nearby Oak Hill Cemetery Chapel.  Although the architect of Grace Episcopal Church is unknown, there is reason to believe Renwick may have designed the building.  If this isn't the case, the person who designed the church was greatly influenced by Renwick's work.

See also
 National Register of Historic Places listings in western Washington, D.C.

References

External links

 Oak Hill Cemetery website

Churches completed in 1850
19th-century churches in the United States
Chapels in Washington, D.C.
Gothic Revival church buildings in Washington, D.C.
James Renwick Jr. church buildings
Properties of religious function on the National Register of Historic Places in Washington, D.C.
Sandstone churches in the United States
Individually listed contributing properties to historic districts on the National Register in Washington, D.C.
Churches in Georgetown (Washington, D.C.)